Phiala uelleburgensis is a moth in the family Eupterotidae. It was described by Strand in 1912. It is found in Equatorial Guinea.

References

Moths described in 1912
Eupterotinae